Vladimir Galuzin (born August 6, 1988) is a professional ice hockey player. He is currently playing with HC Vityaz in the Kontinental Hockey League (KHL).

Playing career
Galuzin made his Kontinental Hockey League debut playing with Torpedo Nizhny Novgorod during the inaugural 2008–09 KHL season.

As one of the longest tenured players with Torpedo, Galuzin played the first fourteen seasons of his professional career with the club before leaving as a free agent following the 2018–19 season. On 1 May 2019, Galuzin agreed to a two-year contract with Metallurg Magnitogorsk. In the 2019–20 season, Galuzin struggled to adapt with Magnitogorsk in producing just 1 goal and 2 points in 17 games. On 17 December 2019, Galuzin left Metallurg on mutual grounds to join his third KHL club, Ak Bars Kazan, on a two-year deal.

On 4 July 2020, Galuzin continued his career in the KHL by agreeing to a one-year contract with HC Neftekhimik Nizhnekamsk. In his lone season with Nizhnekamsk in 2020–21, Galuzin contributed with 5 goals and 18 points through 44 regular season games.

As a free agent, Galuzin signed a one-year contract with his fifth KHL club, Amur Khabarovsk, on 11 May 2021.

After splitting the 2021–22 season with Amur and Spartak Moscow, Galuzin signed as a free agent with HC Vityaz on 4 May 2022.

References

External links

1988 births
Living people
Ak Bars Kazan players
Amur Khabarovsk players
Metallurg Magnitogorsk players
HC Neftekhimik Nizhnekamsk players
Russian ice hockey forwards
HC Spartak Moscow players
Torpedo Nizhny Novgorod players
Sportspeople from Nizhny Novgorod
HC Vityaz players